The Church of St Mary the Virgin is in the village of Wistaston, Cheshire, England.  The church is recorded in the National Heritage List for England as a designated Grade II listed building. It is an active Anglican parish church in the diocese of Chester, the archdeaconry of Macclesfield and the deanery of Nantwich.

History
It is believed that there has been a church or chapel on or near the present site for nearly 700 years. The first record of a rector goes back to 1379. The first church on the site would have been a wooden building. The existing records start in 1572. In 1827 the decision was taken that "due to decay it [the church] was unsuitable for public worship". The present church was built in 1827–28 to a design by George Latham. The chancel was lengthened, and a transept was added in 1884. Further alterations were made in 1905.

Architecture

Exterior

The church is built in brick with a slate roof.  Its plan consists of a west tower, a nave and a chancel. The architectural historian Nikolaus Pevsner considered that the church is "entirely Georgian" in style and that this style was maintained in the 1884 additions.

Interior
The chancel has oak panelling with carvings of sunflowers.  The reredos contains representations of the Agnus Dei and Alpha and Omega signs.  The right hand chancel window is to a design of Burne-Jones and was made by Morris and Company. In the church is a parish chest dated 1684 and a number of wall memorials dating from the 19th century. The two-manual organ was built by Hill in 1884 and in 1890 it was moved from the west gallery to the south of the chancel. There is a ring of eight bells.  Six of these were cast by Gillett & Johnston in 1920 and the other two in 1982 by the Whitechapel Bell Foundry.

External features
The churchyard contains the war graves of three soldiers and an airman of World War I, and three soldiers of World War II. It also contains the local war memorial.

See also

Listed buildings in Wistaston

References

Church of England church buildings in Cheshire
Grade II listed churches in Cheshire
Churches completed in 1828
19th-century Church of England church buildings
Georgian architecture in Cheshire
Diocese of Chester